The 29th Indiana Volunteer Infantry Regiment was an infantry regiment that served in the Union Army during the American Civil War.

Service
The 29th Indiana Volunteer Infantry was organized at La Porte, Indiana, on August 27, 1861.
Battle of Shiloh
Siege of Corinth
Battle of Stones River
Battle of Liberty Gap
Battle of Chickamauga
The regiment mustered out of service on December 2, 1865.

Total strength and casualties
The regiment lost 4 officers and 56 enlisted men killed in action or died of wounds and 4 officers and 240 enlisted men who died of disease, for a total of 304 fatalities.

Commanders
 Colonel John Franklin Miller

See also

 List of Indiana Civil War regiments
 Indiana in the Civil War

Notes

References
The Civil War Archive - Indiana Units
Civil War - Indiana

Units and formations of the Union Army from Indiana
1861 establishments in Indiana
Military units and formations established in 1861
Military units and formations disestablished in 1865